Natalia Maria Kukulska (born March 3, 1976) is a Polish singer performing pop and R&B music, turning towards alternative electronica in the 2010s. She debuted as a child singer in 1986, and released her first "adult" solo album in 1996. Her most popular songs include "Dłoń", "Piosenka światłoczuła", "Im więcej ciebie tym mniej", "W biegu", "Tyle słońca w całym mieście" and "Wierność jest nudna". She has sold over 1.8 million albums as of 2014.

Early life

Kukulska was born on March 3, 1976, in Warsaw. She is the daughter of the late singer Anna Jantar, who was extremely popular in the 1970s and died in the 1980 LOT plane crash, and the late composer Jarosław Kukulski, who also wrote songs for Irena Jarocka, Krzysztof Krawczyk, Eleni and many more. She also has a half-brother from her father's second marriage, Piotr Kukulski.

She attended XXI Social High School in Warsaw ("XXI Społecznym Liceum Ogólnokształcącym w Warszawie"), and graduated in 1995.

Career

She began singing professionally in 1984. In 1986 she released her debut studio album, simply titled 'Natalia'. The music publishing studio began promoting her two singles "Puszek Okruszek" and "Co powie tata". 

A year later, she released her second album entitled "Bajki Natalki" ('Natalia's Fairy Tales'), for which she received the first platinum record in the history of Polish phonography. In 1991 she recorded her first CD with Christmas carols entitled "Najpiękniejsze kolędy" ('The Most Beautiful Christmas Carols'). She promoted the album with the singles "Dłoń" and "Piosenka światłoczuła", both of which reached the 32nd place in the Polish Radio's Third Program. The popular songs was certified gold for high domestic sales. In 1995, she was nominated for the Fryderyk award of the Polish phonographic industry in the Album of the Year - Pop category. In 1997, she released a studio album entitled Pulse, which she promoted with the singles "Im więcej ciebie tym mniej", "W biegu" and "Czy ona jest", as well as her own interpretation of Barbra Streisand's song "Woman in Love". The album was called Double Platinum, three months after its premiere.

In November 1997, Kukulska released her song "Ani słowa", during the promotion of Walt Disney Studio's animated film Hercules, during its premiere. On January 26, 1998, Kukulska and the Dutch music duo R'n'G recorded the song "We'll Be Together", which in 2001 appears on their album "The Right Time", which was released all over Europe. In September 1998, she recorded Polish version songs for the movie Quest for Camelot; "On My Father's Wings" ('Niech Duch Ojca niesie mnie') and duet with Andrzej Piaseczny "If I Didn't Have You" ('Jesteś blisko mnie'). She was chosen by producer and composer of the movie, David Foster.

On March 1, 1999, she released an album entitled "Autoportret" ('Self-portrait'), in which she promoted with the singles "Przychodzimy tylko raz", "Skończyło się" and "Zanim wszystko się odwróci". Also in her album included a new version of the hit song "Tyle słońca w całym mieście" from the repertoire of her mother Anna Jantar and a cover of the hit "Heartbreaker" by Dionne Warwick.

On June 4, 1999, Kukulska takes part in the 36th National Festival of Polish Song in Opole, where, apart from her recital, she also conducts a debut concert with Mietek Szcześniak. On March 13, 2000, the album "Tyle Słoń" is released as a recording of the concert dedicated to the memory of Anna Jantar. The event took place on February 23 at the Jewish Theatre in Warsaw, and leading Polish artists performed on stage alongside Natalia.

On April 23, 2001, she presented the album entitled "Tobie", for which she was nominated for Fryderyk in the Album of the Year - Pop category. 
The publishing studio promoted her singles "Niepotrzebny", "Cicho ciepło" and "Jeśli ona". A bonus track of the album was the song "Z głębi serc", which was dedicated to Pope John Paul II. The album was ranked 1st OLiS with the Gold Record status, and the accompanying promotion, she takes part in 10 outdoor concerts with over 600 thousand people.

In April 2004, Kukulska makes her debut at the Roma Musical Theater in Warsaw, where she plays the role of Kim, the main character of the musical Miss Saigon, which was directed by Wojciech Kępczyński. On May 12, 2005, the two-disc compilation "Po tamtej stron" was released . The first CD contains 20 songs performed by Anna Jantar, while the second one Natalia performs four songs of her mother and the song "Po tamtej stron" was specially composed for this occasion.

In November 2007, she released another studio album entitled "Sexi Flexi", which was produced by the Plan B duo - Bartek Królik and Marek Piotrowski . The album received 5 nominations for the Fryderyk award and achieved the status of a Gold Record. It was promoted by singles: "Sexi Flexi", "Pół na pół" and "Fantasies".

In October 2008, she was interviewed as part of CNN's program - "Eye on Poland". On February 24, 2010, accompanied by the Classic Jazz Quartet, she takes part in the concert "Our Contemporary Chopin" as part of the "Chopin Year". During the concert, he performs Chopin's songs arranged by Adam Sztaba. In April, she made her debut as a columnist for the Fashion Magazine devoted to fashion. On May 18, together with her husband Michał Dąbrówka, she releases the album "CoMix", signed as the duo Kukulska & Dąbrówka. The recording session was attended by the Polish Radio Symphony Orchestra conducted by Adam Sztaba. In February 2012, she becomes a trainer in the TVP2 program "Bitwa na głosy" .

In 2016 she was a trainer in the seventh edition of TVP2's The Voice of Poland. On May 25, 2018, she released the album entitled Search in Dreams, containing lullabies with lyrics of songs by late Soviet musician Vladimir Vysotsky. It was recorded with jazz guitarist Marek Napiórkowski. The album was awarded a Fryderyk in the category "album of the year (music for children and youth)".

In 2021, in the TV show entitled "Zakochany Mickiewicz", which was directed by Marcin Kołaczkowski, she sang Adam Mickiewicz's "Invocation".

Personal life

She married musician Michał Dąbrówka in February 2000. They were dating since 1990. Kukulska and Dąbrówka live in Komorów near Warsaw. Their first child, Jan Dąbrówka, was born on June 24, 2000. He was named after Michał Dąbrówka's grandfather. On May 4, 2005 she gave birth to her second child and first daughter, Anna Dąbrówka. The girl was named after Natalia's mother.

Kukulska's maternal grandmother, Halina Szmeterling, took care of her after her mother's tragic death. Mrs. Szmeterling lived with her granddaughter and great-grandchildren in Komorów, but died in September 2016 at the age of 92.

On July 30, 2016 she announced that she's expecting their third child. On January 5, 2017 in Warsaw she gave birth to a daughter, Laura Dąbrówka.

Charitable activities
Kukulska is known for its charitable activities. She has performed at the finals of the Great Orchestra of Christmas Charity many times. In 1997, together with a group of Polish artists, he records the song "Moja i Twoja nadzieja" ('My and Your Hope'). The income from its sale was allocated to the flood victims. 

In 2002, she takes part of the action "Cała Polska czyta Dzieciom", in which she reads a fairy tale to her son, and records a song and a video clip "Wspomnienia są blisko" ('Memories are near'). In August 2005, together with other artists, he records the anthem of the TVN foundation "Nie jesteś sam" ('You are not alone'). On November 20, 2006, she starts the action "Konwój Muszkieterów", for which she records a special CD with live versions of her hits and the Foundation's anthem entitled "Możemy nieść pomoc" ('We can help'). During the action, the Kukulska visited three orphanages, giving their pupils gifts. The income from the sale of the album was allocated to the purchase of Christmas gifts for children from orphanages.

On April 12, 2007, she became the UNICEF Goodwill Ambassador and promoted the School for Africa campaign to establish schools in Angola. Since 2012, she has been an active ambassador of the SOS Children's Villages Association.

Discography

Studio albums

Christmas albums

Collaborative albums

Singles

References

External links
 
 Official Facebook page
 Official YouTube channel

1976 births
English-language singers from Poland
Living people
Musicians from Warsaw
Polish child singers
Polish lyricists
Polish pop singers
Polish R&B singers
20th-century Polish women singers
21st-century Polish women singers
21st-century Polish singers